Ako Si... is the second album and his last album from Star Music of Pinoy rapper, Gloc-9. It has 14 tracks and released under Star Music in 2005.

Track listing 
 D Intro
 Slick n Sly feat. Slick N Sly Kane
 Tula
 Ipagpatawad Mo
 Love Story Ko
 English Tracks
 Get 2 Know You – with Keith Martin
 My Number
 Pa'no Kaya? feat. Aj Jr. & Gayle
 Liwanag – feat Francis Magalona
 Usap Tayo (Hi-Jakk Diss Track)
Bonus Tracks
 Nag-iisang Mundo
 Usap Tayo-extended Mix
 Liwanag-Acoustic Version

Album credits
Executive producers: Annabelle M. Regalado, Enrico C. Santos
Overall album producer: Aristotle Pollisco a.k.a. Gloc-9
Album supervision: Civ Fontanilla
Album coordination: Monina B. Quejano
Publishing coordination: Beth Faustino, Peewee Apostol
Cover concept: Nixon Sy, Andrew S. Castillo
Cover layout and design: Andrew S. Castillo, Joseph De Vera
Photography: Dominique James

References

External links
 Titik Pilipino: The Online Resource for Filipino Songs
 Titik Pilipino: Album Review by Paolo Quiazon

2005 albums
Gloc-9 albums
Star Music albums